Kellogg is an unincorporated community in Cowley County, Kansas, United States.

History
A post office was established in Kellogg in 1884, and remained in operation until it was discontinued in 1910.

Education
The community is served by Oxford USD 358 public school district.

References

Further reading

External links
 Cowley County maps: Current, Historic, KDOT

Unincorporated communities in Cowley County, Kansas
Unincorporated communities in Kansas